Edward William Ebdon (22 April 1870 — 6 December 1950) was an English cricketer. He was a right-handed batsman and wicket-keeper who played for Somerset. He was born in Bradford on Tone and died in Weston-Super-Mare.

Ebdon made two first-class appearances for Somerset, the first in 1891 against Marylebone Cricket Club and the second seven years later against Sussex.

Ebdon's brothers, John and Percy, had short first-class careers.

External links
Edward Ebdon at Cricket Archive 

1870 births
1950 deaths
English cricketers
Somerset cricketers
People from Taunton Deane (district)